Salvatore Frank Fasano (born August 10, 1971) is an American former professional baseball catcher, who played for nine different Major League Baseball (MLB) teams over his 11-year big league career. Upon retiring as a player, he became a coach within the Toronto Blue Jays organization between 2010 and 2016. After coaching for a single season within the Los Angeles Angels minor league system, Fasano joined the major league coaching staff of the Atlanta Braves.

Jeff Pearlman of ESPN.com said of Fasano: "When I think of Sal Fasano, however, I think of greatness. Not of Willie Mays or Ted Williams greatness, but of a uniquely excellent human being who, were class and decency the most valued standards of a career, would be the easiest Hall of Fame inductee of all time."

Professional career

Kansas City Royals
After three seasons in the minor leagues, Fasano made his Major League debut on April 3, for the Royals. He spent the next three seasons splitting catching duties with starter Mike Macfarlane and rising prospect Mike Sweeney. In , he established career highs in at bats (216) and RBI (31). He also ranked second in the American League in HBPs with 16. In his first 4 seasons with the Royals, Fasano batted .219 with 20 home runs and 67 RBI.

Oakland Athletics
Fasano helped the A's capture the A.L. West division crown that season, and made his, to date, only post season appearance as a defensive replacement. While with Oakland, Fasano says, he came to realize that many players around him were taking anabolic steroids, and briefly considered following suit, but he decided against it. In 63 total games with the Athletics, Fasano hit .190 with 7 home runs and 19 RBI.

Return to Kansas City
On May 22, 2001, the Royals purchased Fasano from the Athletics. He appeared in only 3 games for the Royals, and went hitless in his lone at-bat before being traded to Colorado.

Colorado Rockies
On June 24, 2001, Fasano and Mac Suzuki were traded to the Colorado Rockies for Brent Mayne. In 25 games for the Rockies, Fasano hit .254 with 3 home runs and 9 RBI.

2002–2005
On January 11, 2002, Fasano signed a minor league contract with the Tampa Bay Devil Rays, and was released on June 1. On June 6, he signed with the Milwaukee Brewers organization. On July 31, Fasano and Alex Ochoa were traded to the Anaheim Angels for Jorge Fabregas and a player to be named later. Fasano played in only 2 games for the Angels, going 0–1 at the plate with a strikeout. On November 5, 2002, he was released by the Angels. He did not play baseball at any level in 2003, and on January 14, 2004, signed a minor league contract with the New York Yankees. Fasano appeared in 76 games for the Triple-A Columbus Clippers in 2004, and hit .229 with 10 home runs and 34 RBI.

Fasano was released by the Yankees organization on October 15, 2004. On December 16, he signed with the Baltimore Orioles and appeared in 64 games for them during the 2005 season. Fasano had arguably the best season of his Major League career with Baltimore, hitting .250 with 11 home runs and 20 RBI. He became a free agent on October 15, 2005.

Philadelphia Phillies
Fasano began  for the Philadelphia Phillies as a backup to Mike Lieberthal. His distinctive Fu Manchu mustache earned him the cult admiration of Phillies fans, who began a Phan Phavorites fan club called Sal's Pals. Fasano showed his gratitude by buying the group tickets and pizza. Fasano began to see more playing time as Lieberthal got injured, eventually taking over the starting role. His light hitting though cost him his job as rookie backstop Chris Coste emerged in Lieberthal's absence. When Lieberthal returned, there was no spot for Fasano. He was designated for assignment and acquired by the New York Yankees in exchange for minor league infielder Hector Made. In 50 games for the Phillies, Fasano hit .243 with 4 home runs and 10 RBI.

New York Yankees
One of Fasano's first acts as a Yankee was to trim his facial hair in accordance with the Yankees' personal appearance policy. He spent the late summer and September as a back-up to Jorge Posada and did not appear in the Yankees' four-game loss to the Detroit Tigers in the Division Series. On August 19, 2006, Fasano made his first career pinch-running appearance, taking the place of fellow catcher Jorge Posada during a 13–5 win over the Boston Red Sox at Fenway Park. During that game, Fasano nearly picked off Manny Ramirez after blocking the plate and denying the Red Sox another run. In 28 games for the Yankees, Fasano batted .143 with 1 home run and 5 RBI.

Toronto Blue Jays
Fasano agreed to a minor league contract with the Toronto Blue Jays on January 17, and was invited to Major League spring training. On April 26, the Blue Jays purchased Fasano's contract from Triple-A Syracuse of the International League in order to fill a void left by an injury to Gregg Zaun. During this time, he shared catching responsibilities with Jason Phillips. His first at bat as a Blue Jay came against the Texas Rangers on April 28. Following the return of Zaun, the Blue Jays designated Fasano for assignment on June 13 and sent him outright to Syracuse on June 16.

At Syracuse, he hit .413 and earned a surprise call-up to the Blue Jays. He had a .178 average with 1 home run and 4 RBI in 16 games during his brief stint as a replacement for the injured Zaun. He finished the season as a member of the Blue Jays 40-man roster and the back-up to Gregg Zaun and Curtis Thigpen. On March 25, 2008, Fasano was released by the Blue Jays.

Atlanta Braves
On April 11, 2008, Fasano signed as a free agent with the Atlanta Braves and was assigned to their Triple-A affiliate, the Richmond Braves. In 26 games for Richmond, Fasano hit .193 with 2 home runs and 9 RBI.

Cleveland Indians
On June 19, 2008, Fasano was traded by the Braves to the Cleveland Indians for a player to be named later and assigned to the Major League team as a backup for Kelly Shoppach with Víctor Martínez on the disabled list. In 15 games for the Indians in 2008, Fasano batted .261 with 6 RBI.

Return to Colorado

On February 10, Fasano signed a minor league deal to return to the Rockies. He was also extended an invitation to Major League spring training. Fasano played the entire 2009 season in Triple-A, batting .236 with 4 home runs and 21 RBI in 61 games for Colorado Springs, and retired at the end of the season.

Coaching career
On November 25, 2009, Fasano returned to the Blue Jays organization, accepting a managerial position with their Single-A affiliate, the Lansing Lugnuts, leading the 2010 team to a season record of 70–69 (.504).

On November 28, 2010, Fasano accepted the position as the manager of the New Hampshire Fisher Cats, the Double-A affiliate of the Toronto Blue Jays.

In 2011, Fasano was named Double-A Manager of the Year for leading the New Hampshire Fisher Cats to an Eastern League championship win. During the offseason, Fasano was given the position of Roving Catching Instructor in Player Development. Gary Allenson was named manager of the Fisher Cats.

After being dismissed from the Blue Jays staff, Fasano became the manager for the Mobile BayBears for the 2017 season. The season ended with a record of 34–36 (.486).

In the fall of 2017, Fasano took a job as the catching instructor for the Atlanta Braves. This is the first coaching job he has had in Major League Baseball.

Personal life
Fasano is the son of Vincent and Nella Fasano, Italian immigrants who settled in the Chicago area. He graduated from Hoffman Estates High School in Illinois, and played at the Division I University of Evansville, and is married to Kerri Kubinski, who was a volleyball player at Evansville. Fasano is a born-again Christian; he was introduced to spirituality by Kansas City teammate Keith Lockhart and credits religion with curtailing his desire to drink. Sal and Kerri have three children: Vincenzo, Angelo, and Santino. Santino was born with hypoplastic left heart syndrome and was successfully operated on.

References

External links

Sal Fasano more than a human spare part
Throwback Backstop: The story of how Sal Fasano became Philly's latest fan favorite
Ballplayer has baby's heart on his mind

1971 births
Living people
American expatriate baseball players in Canada
American people of Italian descent
Atlanta Braves coaches
Anaheim Angels players
Baltimore Orioles players
Baseball coaches from Illinois
Baseball players from Chicago
Cleveland Indians players
Colorado Rockies players
Colorado Springs Sky Sox players
Columbus Clippers players
Durham Bulls players
Evansville Purple Aces baseball players
Indianapolis Indians players
Kansas City Royals players
Major League Baseball catchers
New Hampshire Fisher Cats managers
New York Yankees players
Oakland Athletics players
Omaha Royals players
Ottawa Lynx players
Philadelphia Phillies players
Richmond Braves players
Sportspeople from Chicago
Toronto Blue Jays players
Omaha Golden Spikes players